Vauquois is a commune in the Meuse department in Grand Est in north-eastern France.

During World War 1, Vauquois was the site of violent mine warfare, also in connection with the Battle of Verdun (1916). Vauquois was destroyed and many huge craters and dugouts remain.

The French papyrologist Jean Maspero (1885–1915) died in Vauquois, as did biologist Auguste Chaillou.

See also
 Communes of the Meuse department

References

External links
 From The Air - Butte de Vauquois, Steven Upton, 2016, YouTube

Further reading
 

Communes of Meuse (department)